Bogdan Aurelian Pătrașcu (born 7 May 1979) is a Romanian former footballer who played as a defensive midfielder.

Career

He started his career at Sportul Studențesc București, from where he was transferred to the Bulgarian club Litex Lovech in 2000. In 2002, he arrived in Italy, at Piacenza where he spent most of his career. In August 2008 he was loaned to Serie A newcomer Chievo.

In 2009, he signed a contract for a year with Padova, but in June 2010, he was released by Padova as the contract was not renewed.

He returned in Romania, to his ancient club, Sportul Studențesc București. After half a season with Sportul, he was released following a mutual agreement, and signed a contract for one and a half years with Dinamo București. In February 2012, he was transferred to Astra Ploiești. His contract lasted only six months and wasn't renewed, so he became a free agent and signed a contract for a year with Universitatea Cluj.

Honours
Litex Lovech
Bulgarian Cup: 2000–01

References

External links
 
 
 
 

1979 births
Sportspeople from Târgoviște
Living people
Romanian footballers
Association football midfielders
Romania international footballers
Liga I players
Liga II players
FC Sportul Studențesc București players
FC Dinamo București players
FC Astra Giurgiu players
FC Universitatea Cluj players
LPS HD Clinceni players
CS Balotești players
First Professional Football League (Bulgaria) players
PFC Litex Lovech players
Serie A players
Serie B players
Piacenza Calcio 1919 players
A.C. ChievoVerona players
Serie C players
Calcio Padova players
Romanian expatriate footballers
Romanian expatriate sportspeople in Bulgaria
Expatriate footballers in Bulgaria
Romanian expatriate sportspeople in Italy
Expatriate footballers in Italy
Romanian football managers
CS Balotești managers
FC Rapid București assistant managers